The Two Oceans Aquarium is an aquarium located at the Victoria & Alfred Waterfront in Cape Town, Western Cape, South Africa. The aquarium was opened on the 13 November 1995 and comprises several exhibition galleries with large viewing windows:  The aquarium is named for its location, where the Indian and Atlantic Ocean meet.

Exhibits

 Diversity Gallery - This gallery showcases marine life of South Africa's two oceans, and the major Benguela and Agulhas Currents that dominate its shores. Notable species include Knysna seahorses, moray eels, anemonefish, cryptic klipfish, sea stars, compass jellyfish, shysharks and temporary exhibitions of foreign species.
 I&J Children's Play Centre - Various activities to keep the young visitors entertained. Puppet shows, arts and craft.
 Save Our Seas Foundation Shark Exhibit - This exhibit holds 2 million litres of seawater. Ragged-tooth sharks as well as various other fishes are found in the exhibit. 
 I&J Ocean Exhibit - This exhibit holds 1.6 million litres of seawater. Various fishes, rays and turtles to be seen in this exhibit.
Kelp Forest Exhibit - One of the aquarium's biggest attractions, this underwater forest is home to shoals of coastal fishes, such as white musselcrackers, steenbras and spotted gully sharks, and living specimens of South Africa's kelp species, sea bamboo, split-fan kelp and bladder kelp. The northern rockhopper penguins also use this exhibit for their exercise.
 Penguin Exhibit - African black-footed penguins, northern rockhopper penguins, western leopard toads and African clawed frogs. A river course divided into three sections (upper, middle and lower) with examples of native and invasive freshwater fishes is also present

Gallery

References

External links

 Official Website
 http://www.waterfront.co.za - For more tourist activities around Two Oceans Aquarium

Aquaria in South Africa
Buildings and structures in Cape Town
Tourist attractions in Cape Town
1995 establishments in South Africa